is a passenger railway station located in the town of Sayō, Sayō District, Hyōgo Prefecture, Japan, operated by West Japan Railway Company (JR West).

Lines

Station layout
The station consists of two opposed unnumbered side platforms connected to the station building by a level crossing. The station is unattended.

Platforms

History
Mikazuki Station opened on March 24, 1934.  With the privatization of the Japan National Railways (JNR) on April 1, 1987, the station came under the aegis of the West Japan Railway Company.

Passenger statistics
In fiscal 2019, the station was used by an average of 125 passengers daily.

Surrounding area
 Sayo Town Hall Mikazuki Branch (former Mikazuki Town Hall)
 Mikazuki Jin'ya

See also
List of railway stations in Japan

References

External links

 Station Official Site

Railway stations in Hyōgo Prefecture
Kishin Line
Railway stations in Japan opened in 1934
Sayō, Hyōgo